The 2021–22 James Madison Dukes women's basketball team represented James Madison University during the 2021–22 NCAA Division I women's basketball season. The Dukes, led by sixth-year head coach Sean O'Regan, played their home games at the Atlantic Union Bank Center as members of the Colonial Athletic Association (CAA). They finished the season 14–15, 10–8 in CAA play. As this was their last season in the CAA, the conference banned all athletic teams at JMU, including women's basketball from participating in all post-season play.

Previous season

Roster

Schedule and results

|-
!colspan=12 style=| Exhibition
|-

|-
!colspan=12 style=| Non-conference Regular Season
|-

|-
!colspan=12 style=| Conference Regular Season
|-

See also 
 2021–22 James Madison Dukes men's basketball team

References 

James Madison Dukes women's basketball seasons
James Madison
James Madison Dukes women's basketball
James Madison Dukes women's basketball